Stanley Kipleting Biwott (born 21 April 1986) is a Kenyan long-distance runner who competes in half marathon and marathon races. He won the 2012 Paris Marathon in a course record time of 2:05:11 hours and the 2015 New York City Marathon. His half marathon best is 58:56 minutes.

Career
He began working with Italian coach Claudio Berardelli in 2006 and came seventh at that year's Carpi Marathon. He was employed as the pacemaker at the Roma-Ostia Half Marathon the following February and he finished third with a time of 1:01:20 hours behind his training partners Benson Barus and Jonathan Kosgei Kipkorir.

He headed to Brazil in 2009 and came sixth at the Pampulha Lagoon International Race, then seventh at the Saint Silvester Road Race. His first marathon win came the year after at the São Paulo Marathon and his time of 2:11:19 hours was the fastest ever on the South American soil. He dipped under two hours and ten minutes for the first time at the 2010 Reims à Toutes Jambes, where he was three seconds behind the winner Stephen Chebogut with a finishing time of 2:09:41 hours.

At the start of 2011 he improved his half marathon best to 1:00:23 hours in winning the Azkoitia-Azpeitia Half Marathon. At the Chuncheon Marathon he outran his teammate Jonathan Kosgei Kipkorir and won the race in a personal best of 2:07:03 hours – a course record and personal best by more than two minutes. He ended the year with a third place at the Zhuhai Half Marathon, losing out in a sprint finish.

Biwott began 2012 with his first sub-one hour half marathon; his finishing time of 59:44 minutes was enough to win the Paris Half Marathon in a course record. Reaching a new career high, he recorded a marathon best of 2:05:11 hours to win the Paris Marathon a month later. He took the lead after the halfway point and continued at a fast pace to claim the prestigious course record. In the latter half of the road racing season he won both the Beach to Beacon 10K and the Falmouth Road Race. He was a comfortable winner at the Philadelphia Half Marathon, finishing forty seconds ahead of the field.

His first race of 2013 of the Ras Al Khaimah Half Marathon where he finished as runner-up to Geoffrey Kipsang, running a best of 58:56 minutes to move up to tenth on the all-time lists.

At the 2014 London Marathon Biwott ran a career best time of 2:04:55 to finish in 2nd place.

In March 2015, he won the City-Pier-City-Loop half marathon in the fastest time of the season (00:59:20).

In November 2015, he won the 2015 New York City Marathon in 2:10:34.

At the 2016 London Marathon he improved his career best to 2:03:51, coming second behind Eliud Kipchoge and placing him sixth on the all-time ranking list.

Marathons

References

External links

Living people
1986 births
Kenyan male long-distance runners
Kenyan male marathon runners
New York City Marathon male winners
Paris Marathon male winners
World Athletics record holders
20th-century Kenyan people
21st-century Kenyan people